The Silent Playground is a 1963 British thriller film written and directed by Stanley Goulder.

Production
The film was shot on location in 24 days for $75,000 by debut feature director Goulder, who had previously made documentaries.

Plot premise
In Greenwich, London, just before Christmas Mavis Nugent (Ellen McIntosh), a young widow, drops her children outside the cinema for Saturday morning pictures so that she can go to work at a local haberdashers'. A man approaches the cinema queue and gives out handfuls of what the children take to be sweets. At the end of the film showing the cinema staff find several of the children unconscious with barbiturate poisoning. A police investigation begins, led by Inspector Duffy (Bernard Archard.) After one of the children blacks out in the street later a friend of his shows the police two types of capsules. At the hospital Dr Green (Desmond Llewelyn) and the nurses fight to save the children. 

After his mother realises that her adult son does not have all of the mental health medication that had been dispensed to him that morning, the hunt shifts to a nervous and vulnerable hospital outpatient, Simon Lacey (Roland Curram), who has been unwittingly handing out the pills. The police are able to apprehend him, but not before he has thrown away the rest of the drugs in a playground where children are playing. Meanwhile police search for Mrs Nugent and her three children.

Cast

Reception
It was a commercial disappointment.

Critical
Variety wrote that "this is quality production...[Goulder's] screenplay is taut, economic and natural in dialog and his direction is unfussy and alert." and TV Guide wrote that "The story never panders to its more sensational elements but is, instead, an intelligent and sensitive thriller".

References

External links
Review at Variety
Silent Playground at IMDb

1963 films
British crime thriller films
British black-and-white films
Films directed by Stanley Goulder
1960s English-language films
1960s British films